MoltenVK is a software library which allows Vulkan applications to run on top of Metal on Apple's macOS, iOS, and tvOS operating systems. It is the first software component to be released for the Vulkan Portability Initiative, a project to have a subset of Vulkan run on platforms lacking native Vulkan drivers.

There are some limitations compared with a native Vulkan implementation.

History
MoltenVK was first released as a proprietary and commercially licensed product by The Brenwill Workshop on July 27, 2016.

On July 31, 2017, Khronos announced the formation of the Vulkan Portability Technical Subgroup.

Open source 
On February 26, 2018, Khronos announced that Vulkan became available on macOS and iOS products through the MoltenVK library. Valve announced that Dota 2 will run on macOS using the Vulkan API with the aid of MoltenVK, and that they had made an arrangement with developer The Brenwill Workshop Ltd to release MoltenVK as open-source software under the Apache License version 2.0.

On May 30, 2018, Qt was updated with Vulkan for Qt on macOS using MoltenVK. On May 31, 2018, optional Vulkan support for Dota 2 on macOS was released. Benchmarks for the game were available the following day, showing better performance using Vulkan and MoltenVK compared to OpenGL. On July 20, 2018, Wine was updated with Vulkan support on macOS using MoltenVK. On 29 July 2018, the first app using MoltenVK was accepted onto the App Store, after initially being rejected. On 6 August 2018, Google open-sourced Filament, a crossplatform real-time physically based rendering engine with MoltenVK for macOS/iOS. On November 28, 2018, Valve released Artifact, their first Vulkan-only game on macOS using MoltenVK.

Version 1.0 
On 29 January 2019, MoltenVK 1.0.32 was released with early prototype of Vulkan Portability Extensions. RPCS3 and Dolphin emulators were updated with Vulkan support on macOS using MoltenVK. On 13 April 2019, MoltenVK 1.0.34 was released with support for tessellation. On July 30, 2019, MoltenVK 1.0.36 was released targeting Metal 3.0. On July 31, 2020, MoltenVK 1.0.44 was released, adding support for the tvOS platform. On January 23, 2020, MoltenVK was updated to support for some of the new features of Vulkan 1.2, as of Vulkan SDK 1.2.121.

Version 1.1 
On October 1, 2020, MoltenVK 1.1.0 was released, adding full support for Vulkan 1.1, as of Vulkan SDK 1.2.154.

On 9 December, 2020, MoltenVK 1.1.1 was released, providing support for Vulkan on Apple silicon GPUs and support for the Mac Catalyst platform for porting iOS/iPadOS apps to macOS.

Version 1.2 
On October 18, 2022, MoltenVK 1.2.0 was released, adding full support for Vulkan 1.2 as of Vulkan SDK 1.3.231.

References

External links
 MoltenVK Source Code
 Vulkan Portability Initiative

Computer libraries
Graphics software
Vulkan (API)
MacOS graphics-related software
IOS development software
Free and open-source software

Formerly proprietary software